The women's 1000 meter at the 2016 KNSB Dutch Single Distance Championships took place in Heerenveen at the Thialf ice skating rink on Sunday 29 December 2015. Though this tournament was held in 2015, it was part of the speed skating season 2015–2016. 
There were 22 participants.

Title holder was Marrit Leenstra.

Result

  WDR = Withdrew

Source:

References 

Single Distance Championships
2016 Single Distance
World